Lenzie Football Club was an association football club based in the town of Lenzie, in Dunbartonshire.

History
The club was founded in 1874.  Its earliest reported match was from the 1875–76 season; a 4–0 win over the "Alert" club (possibly a misprint for Albert) in January, with a hat-trick for Kirkland. 

Lenzie entered the Scottish Cup every season from 1876–77 until 1883–84, but with a pronounced lack of success.  The club only ever won two Cup ties; the first against Ailsa F.C. in 1877–78, and the second by 3–0 at home to Thistle Athletic F.C. of Milngavie in 1878–79, with the visitors disputing one of the goals.

In 1880–81, the club reached the third round, thanks to the luck of the draw; twice the club was awarded byes.  In the third round, Campsie Central beat the club 6–1.

The club existed "in name only" from 1883 to 1885, albeit retaining membership of the Scottish Football Association, and there still being "some funds to the credit of the club", which sparked an attempt was made to revive the side in 1885.  The revived club entered the 1885–86 Scottish Cup, drawing 1–1 with Bonhill F.C. in the first round, but losing 6–0 in the replay.  The club also entered the Dumbartonshire Cup for the only time but withdrew when drawn to face Dumbarton Athletic.

In the 1886–87 Scottish Cup, the withdrawal of first round opponents Dunbritton put the club into the second round, but a 13–0 defeat at home to Vale of Leven F.C. persuaded the club to turn Junior, and the club continued on a low-key level until the 1890–91 season.

Colours

The club's colours were white shirts and knickerbockers, and navy blue hose.

Ground

The club played at a ground simply known as the Lenzie Football Field.  In 1888 the club opened a new ground at Middlemuir Park.

External links

 Scottish Cup results (NB the 1878–79 defeat to Jamestown F.C. refers to the Lennox club, not to Lenzie)

References

Lenzie
Association football clubs established in 1874
Association football clubs disestablished in 1891
Football in West Dunbartonshire
1874 establishments in Scotland
1891 disestablishments in Scotland